Colin Willock (13 January 1919 – 26 March 2005) was a magazine editor and a nature documentary writer and producer, working on series such as ITV's Survival.

Aubrey Buxton brought him in to work on the first ever programme in the Survival series in 1961, The London Scene.

He was awarded the Royal Geographical Society's Cherry Kearton Medal and Award in 1987.

Works
Death in Covert (1961)
The London Scene (1961)
Flight of the Snow Geese (1972)

See also
Survival (TV series)

References

External links 

1919 births
2005 deaths
British magazine editors
British documentary filmmakers